A patent court is a court specializing in patent law, or having substantially exclusive jurisdiction over patent law issues. In some systems, such courts also have jurisdiction over other areas of intellectual property law, such as copyright and trademark.

By jurisdiction

European Union 
Unified Patent Court, a planned court for patent litigation in the European Union

Germany 
Federal Patent Court of Germany (German: Bundespatentgericht or BPatG)

Japan 
Intellectual Property High Court

Switzerland 
Federal Patent Court of Switzerland

United Kingdom

England and Wales
Intellectual Property Enterprise Court, formerly Patents County Court
Patents Court

United States 
United States Court of Appeals for the Federal Circuit (exercising jurisdiction formerly vested in the United States Court of Customs and Patent Appeals)

See also 
 Intellectual property organisation
 Patent office

Patent law
Courts by type